The Adriatic Campaign of World War I was a naval campaign fought between the Central Powers and the Mediterranean squadrons of Great Britain, France, the Kingdom of Italy, Australia and the United States.

Characteristics
First World War naval action in the Adriatic consisted mainly of Austro-Hungarian bombardments of Italy's eastern coast, and wider-ranging German and Austro-Hungarian submarine forays into the Mediterranean.

Allied forces mainly limited themselves to blockading the Central Powers' navies in the Adriatic, which was successful in regards to surface units, but failed for the U-boats, which found safe harbours and easy passage into and out of the area for the whole of the war. Considered a relatively secondary part of the naval warfare of World War I, it nonetheless tied down significant forces.

The Adriatic campaign was also important because for the first time two new weapons were used successfully in warfare, viz. the MAS torpedo boat of Luigi Rizzo that sank the battleship  and the human torpedo of Raffaele Rossetti that sank the battleship  in 1918.

History

1914

Beginning of the war

On 6 August 1914 an Anglo-French naval agreement was signed, giving France leadership of naval operations in the Mediterranean. The remaining British Mediterranean forces – one armoured cruiser, four light cruisers, and 16 destroyers – were placed under the control of the French Mediterranean Fleet, and bases at both Gibraltar and Malta were opened to the French.

One day after the French declaration of war against Austria-Hungary on 11 August, a French fleet under Admiral Augustin Boué de Lapeyrère arrived at Malta. He had orders to sail with all available French and British ships, pass into the Adriatic Sea, and undertake whatever operations he thought best against Austrian ports. Lapeyrère decided to surprise Austrian vessels enforcing a blockade of Montenegro. Two French squadrons of pre-dreadnoughts, two squadrons of cruisers, and five destroyer squadrons were held back in support. The British support group comprised two armoured cruisers and three destroyer divisions.

Throughout most of late August most of the action was simple bombardment of Serbian and Montenegrin troops by Austrian ships. On 9 August, the pre-dreadnought  shelled the French radio station at Budva, while the destroyer  shelled Mount Lovćen. On 17 August, Monarch shelled a Montenegrin radio station off Bar, then another station off Volovica Point on 19 August. Meanwhile, a French squadron shelled Austrian troops on Prevlaka.

The French and Montenegrin forces attempted to cause havoc also at Cattaro in September, October and November 1914, and the KuK navy was called in there also, resulting in a decisive defeat for the Allies.

Both the French and the Austrians spent much of this time laying extensive minefields throughout the shallow waters of the Adriatic. Mostly this was done by destroyers, and at night. Several steamships ran afoul of these mines and either sank or were damaged.

The Goeben

In July, the German battlecruiser  sailed to Triest from Pola. She and the German cruiser  had been anchored there since the beginning of the summer. On 1 August, Goeben and Breslau rendezvoused at Brindisi, then headed for Messina to take on coal. They left for Constantinople on 6 August, shadowed by the British cruiser .

On 7 August, an Austro-Hungarian Fleet—consisting of six battleships, two cruisers, and 19 destroyers and torpedo boats—sortied from Pola to escort Goeben and Breslau through Austro-Hungarian territorial waters, returned to port following day without ever making contact. Goeben and Breslau briefly engaged HMS Gloucester and the chase was abandoned by the British. By 10 August, both German warships were safely in the Dardanelles and heading for Turkey.

Winter
In November, the French submarine  managed to slip into the Bocche di Cattaro as far as Topla Bay but was chased out by the Austrian destroyer , and the torpedo boat Tb 57T. In mid-December, the French submarine  raided the harbour barrage of Pola to wait for her chance to intrude. Two days later, on 20 December, during an attempt to sneak into the harbour she got entangled in an anti-submarine net and could not free herself. Forced to surface for fresh air, she was sunk by the Austrian destroyer  and Tb 63T, with three casualties. The Austrians raised the wreck between December 1914 and February 1915.

On 21 December, the submarine  scored one torpedo hit on the French battleship Jean Bart off Sazan Island. The battleship had to withdraw to Malta for extensive repairs.

1915
In February, the French destroyer —while escorting the transport Whitehead to Bar—was sunk after hitting a mine. Also that month, the Austrian submarine U-12 was unsuccessfully attacked off Cape Mendra by a French submarine. Austrian destroyer  shelled Montenegrin positions at Bar with Tb 15 and Tb 68F.

U-5 also torpedoed the French armoured cruiser  after a two-day chase off Santa Maria di Leuca, causing 684 fatalities including Rear-Admiral Sénès. Only 137 French sailors survived. The Austrian  torpedoed and damaged the British light cruiser . Also, the Austrian destroyer  shelled enemy positions at Bar.

Bombardment of Ancona

When Italy declared war on Austria-Hungary on 23 May, the Austrian fleet was quick to act, launching several attacks on the Marche region of Italy. That day, the destroyer Dinara and Tb 53T bombarded the port of Ancona. The destroyer —on reconnaissance duty between Palagruža and Cape Gargano—shelled the semaphore and radio station at Vieste and fired upon the Italian destroyer . On 24 May, the bulk of the Austrian fleet at Pola sailed for the Italian Adriatic coast. This included the dreadnoughts Viribus Unitis,  and eight semi and pre-dreadnoughts. The fleet bombarded several cities and other targets in and around the Province of Ancona, especially damaging the port and town of Ancona itself.

The destroyer  shelled the Italian airship Città di Ferrara off Ancona. The semi-dreadnought  and two torpedo boats bombarded Potenza Picena, then returned to Pola. The Radetzky-class semi-dreadnought , with two torpedo boats bombarded Senigallia, destroying a train and damaging a railway station and a bridge, then returned to Pola. The torpedo boat Tb 3 was unsuccessfully bombed by an Italian airship. The light cruiser  shelled the Italian signal station at Cretaccio Island, while the armoured cruiser —with two torpedo boats—shelled Rimini, damaging and derailing a freight train. The destroyer  shelled the signal station near Torre di Mileto. The light cruiser , a destroyer and two torpedo boats entered Corsini Channel and shelled an Italian torpedo boat station, a semaphore station, and coastal artillery batteries.

The light cruiser —aided by four destroyers—sank the Italian destroyer Turbine in a pitched battle south of Pelagosa. The destroyer  shelled the railway embankment near Manfredonia while the destroyer  shelled the Manfredonia railway station.

Finally, Austro-Hungarian flying boats dropped bombs on Venice and airship hangars at Chiaravalle.

Allied raids
In response, on 5 June, four different Allied task forces attacked the Austrian coast. Four Italian armoured cruisers, escorted by four French destroyers, shelled Cavtat; the British cruiser Dublin—escorted by five Italian destroyers—shelled Donzella; the Italian light cruiser —escorted by four destroyers—bombarded Lastovo; the Italian light cruiser , two Italian and two French destroyers shelled the island of Lissa. On 9 June, a mixed force of British, French and Italian destroyers shelled the Austro-Hungarian signal station at Cape Rondini in Albania.

The summer of 1915
Sankt Georg and a squadron of torpedo boats bombarded Rimini on 16 June, causing minor damage. Then on 17 June, the cruisers Novara and Admiral Spaun and their escorts attacked and sank the Italian steamer Maria Grazia off Giulianova. The next day, they shelled Rimini and Fano, destroying the Italian signal station there.

But this was not without losses. On 13 August,  was sunk at Brindisi by the French destroyer Bisson, after having been severely damaged by the Italian auxiliary cruiser  the day before.

The Austro-Hungarian naval air-arm also began regular bombing raids against Bari and Brindisi in June, slightly damaging the British protected cruiser  in one such raid with machine gun fire. And the British armed trawler Schiehallion was sunk by a mine. The  was sunk off Venice by the German submarine  on July 2. While the Italian scout cruiser  shelled Gravosa station on 18 July, the scout cruiser Quarto and three Italian destroyers attacked the Austrian installation at Guiparra.

SMS Helgoland, seven destroyers and four torpedo boats supported an Austrian landing at Pelagosa on 28 July. The landing was repulsed by the Italian garrison, that had arrived in the island on July 11. On August 17 the light cruisers "Helgoland", "Saida" and several destroyers bombarded the island again. The water reservoir was severely damaged and the next day the Italians began the evacuation. On 17 August, one of the cruisers was unsuccessfully torpedoed by an Italian submarine on return journey. The last act of the summer was the sinking on 26 September of the Italian battleship  in Brindisi harbour by Italian-speaking Austro-Hungarian saboteurs. Over 450 were killed.

In late September, the Allies established the Otranto Barrage, an attempt to blockade the entrance to the Adriatic Sea at the Strait of Otranto.

December

In early December, the French submarine  ran aground off the Bojana River estuary due to bad navigation, and was sunk by the Austrian destroyer Warasdiner. The cruiser Helgoland and three destroyers sortie against the Otranto Barrage from 5–22 December and performed reconnaissance off the Albanian coast and San Giovanni di Medua. They sank an Italian picket boat, three steamships loaded with ammunition and two armed schooners en route to Northern Albania.

The light cruiser SMS Helgoland and five Tatra-class destroyers left Cattaro and headed for Durazzo late on 28 December 1915. While on passage the French submarine  was rammed by the cruiser SMS Helgoland, and finally sunk by gunfire from the destroyer . Early the next day, the Austrians squadron opened fire on Durazzo targets, sinking some small ships. Then they ran into a minefield. The destroyer Lika was sunk and Triglav was damaged. She was taken in tow and the Austrian force sailed slowly to north.

An allied force had already sailed from Brindisi, with the aim to intercept them. It was composed of the British light cruisers HMS Dartmouth and Weymouth, the Italian light cruisers RN Quarto and Nino Bixio and five French destroyers. In support of the retreating force, the Austrians despatched the armoured cruiser SMS Kaiser Karl VI and the light cruiser Novara from Cattaro. Early in the afternoon of 29 December, the forward Allied ships came into action with the retreating Austrian light squadron, which was still only halfway home. The Triglav was abandoned and scuttled and a long-range gunnery duel was fought throughout the afternoon. SMS Tatra was damaged but the Austrian light force was able to reach Cattaro safely.

1916
Austrian submarines sank or damaged a number of ships in 1916. U-11 captured the Italian hospital ship King Albert on 18 January at San Giovanni di Medua.  sank the French destroyer  on 16 March at Durazzo. On 8 June, U-5 torpedoed and sank the Italian troop transport Principe Umberto at Linguetta. Later, U-5 fought a French-Italian destroyer group to a stalemate on 2 August, and torpedoed the Italian Q-Ship Pantelleria south of Taranto on August 14.

On 15 September 1916, the two Austro-Hungarian seaplanes L.132 and L.135 forced the French submarine  to surface by dropping bombs. L.135 finally sinks the sub while the 27 survivors were clinging to the two planes now floating, to be finally saved by the alarmed Tb 100M. This was the first sinking of a submarine by airplanes in naval war history.

The very same day, the French submarine Ampére scored two torpedo hits on the Austro-Hungarian Hospital ship No I (the former Lloyd steamer Elektra) off Cape Planka (Rt Ploča), causing two fatalities. The damaged hospital ship had to be beached in Borovica Bay for further repairs.

The French and Italian groups met during darkness, Giuseppe Cesare Abba rammed Casque; some moments later, Boutefeu rammed Giuseppe Cesare Abba. While the damaged vessels had to be taken into tow, the Austrians escaped in the darkness.

On hearing that Dartmouth had been torpedoed, Boutefeu went to assist, only to hit one of UC-25s mines.

1917
The Austro-Hungarian Navy had a major victory in May 1917 when it broke out of the allied naval blocked of the Adriatic Sea during the Battle of the Strait of Otranto (1917), however after this, large scale operations were limited. U-4 torpedoed the French steamer Italia near Taranto on 30 May, and on 16 November  severely damaged the Italian steamer Oriona between Brindisi and Valona. On the night of 9–10 December, while SMS Wien and Budapest were at anchor in Trieste, two Italian MAS (motor torpedo boats) managed to penetrate the harbour defences undetected and fired several torpedoes at the two ships. Wien was struck by two torpedoes and sank in less than five minutes with the loss of 46 of her crew.

1918
On 13 February, the submarine  (Audry) was lost with all hands after hitting a mine off the Bocche di Cattaro.

HMS Hornet was badly damaged in the ensuing fight but the alarm went up and the Austrians turned for home, pursued by Jackal, who had lost her mainmast.

The Premuda attack

At 03:30 on the morning of 10 June 1918, the battleship Szent István—in the company of SMS Tegetthoff and seven other ships en route to attack the Otranto Barrage – was seen by chance and then hit by two torpedoes launched from the Italian MAS-15 Motor Torpedo Boat under Corvette Captain Luigi Rizzo near Premuda island, near Zara. Many of the 1,087 crew were asleep, getting rested for the battle expected in a few hours. Immediate chaos soon changed into frantic efforts to save the vessel which was rapidly shipping water. SMS Tegetthoff was hit by another torpedo from a second MAS, but it did not explode.

Then Tegetthoff—which had at first sped away from the vicinity of the torpedo attack—returned and took Szent István in tow, in an attempt to reach the massive dry dock at Pula. However, the pumps were unequal to the task before them due to loss of steam pressure and the ship continued to slowly list, sinking at 06:12, almost 3 hours after being hit.

It is debated that faults in the  design – relatively low displacement and high centre of gravity, together with the weight of twelve  main artillery – did not assist matters. However, most other battleships in The Great War which were either torpedoed or mined sank far more rapidly. There were, however, only 89 dead, partly attributed to the fact that all sailors with the K.u.K. had to learn to swim before entering active service. The attack on the Otranto Barrage was cancelled as a consequence of this attack.

Second Battle of Durazzo
On 2 October, an allied fleet composed of Italian, British, Australian and American warships attacked the port of Durazzo, which had by that time come under Austro-Hungarian occupation, during the Second Battle of Durazzo. The fleet consisted of over 55 vessels along with MAS boats and supporting aircraft. Allied forces destroyed Austro-Hungarian shore batteries and defeated a small squadron of patrol craft while sustaining comparatively light damage. Durazzo was left in flames, several building, bridges and railroad targets were bombarded which forced the evacuation of the city. A week or so after the battle an allied army occupied the city without resistance.

Sinking of Viribus Unitis
On 1 November, the ex-Austro-Hungarian dreadnought flagship Viribus Unitis was sunk – along with the merchant-ship Wien— both at anchor at Pula by  limpet mine attached by the crew of an Italian mignatta. The mignatta was the precursor of the human torpedo and was invented by Major of naval engineers Raffaele Rossetti.

The whole Austrian Navy was at the time being transferred to the new State of Slovenes, Croats and Serbs, but the Italian attackers had not been informed.

Austro-Hungarian submarines results

Many Austro-Hungarian and German U-boats operated out of the Adriatic for the whole of the war. Due to lack of cooperation of the Allies in the Mediterranean control zones, and the late institution of the convoy system, U-boats experienced substantial success throughout the first war years.

The most well-known casualties were:
 
 
 
 
 
 
 
 
 

Also, the K.u.K. Kriegsmarine submarines damaged the following ships:

References

External links
 Serbia, Balkans & Macedonia 1914-18
 Combined Operations in the Adriatic, 1915-18

Military operations of World War I involving Austria-Hungary
Mediterranean naval operations of World War I
Campaigns and theatres of World War I